"For Once in My Life" is a song written by Ron Miller and Orlando Murden for Motown Records' Stein & Van Stock publishing company, and first recorded in 1965.

It was written and first recorded as a slow ballad. There are differing accounts of its earliest versions, although it seems that it was first recorded by Connie Haines, but first released in 1966 by Jean DuShon.  Other early versions of the ballad were issued by Nancy Wilson, the Four Tops, the Temptations, Diana Ross and Tony Bennett, whose recording was the first to reach the pop charts.

The most familiar and successful version of "For Once in My Life" is an uptempo arrangement by Stevie Wonder, recorded in 1967. Wonder's version, issued on Motown's Tamla label, was a top-three hit in the United States and the United Kingdom in late 1968 and early 1969.

Early recordings
Miller and Murden wrote the song in 1965 as a slow ballad, and passed it around various singers so that it could be tried out and refined.  Among those who, it is claimed, heard and performed the song in about 1966 – but did not record it – are Jo Thompson, a club singer in Detroit; Sherry Kaye, who may have performed it in a musical revue at the Gem Theater; and Johnny Hartman, who turned it down.

Jean DuShon
Jean DuShon was one of the singers who was originally tapped by Ron Miller to demo the song as he was fine-tuning the composition. Miller was impressed by DuShon's rendition, and her version, produced by Esmond Edwards, was issued as a single on Chess Records' Cadet label in October 1966. It was chosen "Pick Hit of the Week" by Detroit's WXYZ radio.  Although the record label gave the sole songwriting credit to Murden, Motown CEO Berry Gordy discovered that Miller – who was contracted to Motown – had co-written the song, and reportedly asked Chess not to promote the single. DuShon dropped "For Once in My Life" from her nightclub act and later said: "It was a very big disappointment in my life. I stopped singing it ‘cause I didn’t have the song. I didn’t have anything. It wasn’t mine anymore."

Connie Haines
Connie Haines was a contracted singer signed to Motown in 1965 and as indicated by the Motown session logs and tape information, she recorded the first version of the song at the label in July 1965. Her original version remained unreleased for 50 years until it was released on an MP3 download album Motown Unreleased 1965 in 2015.

Barbara McNair

Barbara McNair's version of the song was recorded as early as October 1965, and backed up by a symphony orchestra and produced by Frank Wilson. Some sources suggest that the song was originally written for McNair; others that Gordy, hearing the song, insisted that she record it. However, her version was not released until it appeared on her November 1966 album, Here I Am. It was also released as the B-side of her 1968 single, "Where Would I Be Without You". In later years, McNair re-recorded the song with a faster tempo.

Other Motown recordings
Singer Jack Soo claimed that he was the first male artist to record a version of the song, after he joined Motown in 1965 as one of their first non-African American artists. The record was never released and was permanently shelved in the Motown archives.

The Four Tops recorded the song on their album 4 Tops On Broadway, released in March 1967 and, like McNair's recording, produced as a slow ballad by Frank Wilson.

The Temptations also recorded the song for their pop standards based album The Temptations in a Mellow Mood, released in July 1967. Baritone singer Paul Williams sings the lead vocal on the song, and it subsequently became his showcase number in the Temptations' live shows. Williams' most famous performance of the number was during The Supremes and Temptations' TCB television special in 1968, a performance cited as the apex of Williams' career. The song also made its way into The Temptations 1998 made-for-television miniseries on NBC. After celebrating The Temptations' (and Motown's) first Grammy Award win for "Cloud Nine", the actor who portrays Paul Williams (Christian Payton) sings the slow ballad version.

Diana Ross & the Supremes recorded a mid-tempo bossa nova inspired version in early 1969 that wasn't discovered until the 2010s and not released until 2019. 

The song would become the most covered song in the Motown catalog by fellow Motown artists: Billy Eckstine (1966), Martha & the Vandellas (1967), Soupy Sales (1968), Jonah Jones (1968), Smokey Robinson & the Miracles (1969), Blinky (1969), Kiki Dee (1969), Sammy Davis Jr. (1969), Joe Harnell (1969), The Ding Dongs (1970), Gladys Knight & the Pips (1973)

Tony Bennett 
Also in 1967, Tony Bennett's recording of the song peaked at number 91 on the Billboard Pop Singles chart (number 8 on the Easy Listening survey) and was the title track of his album For Once in My Life. "For Once in My Life" remained in Bennett's concert repertoire into the 2000s. In 2006 Bennett teamed up with Stevie Wonder to record a ballad tempo version for his Duets: An American Classic album, for which Bennett and Wonder received a Grammy Award for Best Pop Collaboration with Vocals. Bennett also performed it on the grand finale of the sixth season of American Idol and in the Grammy Award-sponsored tribute Stevie Wonder: Songs in the Key of Life – An All-Star Salute, which aired February 16, 2015, on CBS.

Stevie Wonder
Stevie Wonder's version was recorded at about the same time as The Temptations' in the summer of 1967. However, Berry Gordy did not like Wonder's version, an upbeat rendition produced by Henry Cosby. Gordy vetoed the single's release, and the recording was shelved. Billie Jean Brown, the head of the Motown Quality Control department, finally coerced Gordy into allowing Wonder's version to be released in October 1968.

Contrary to Gordy's instincts, "For Once in My Life" was a highly successful record, peaking at number-two on both the Billboard Pop Singles and Billboard R&B Singles (it was held off from the number-one spot on each chart by another Motown single Gordy had originally vetoed, Marvin Gaye's "I Heard It Through the Grapevine"). "For Once in My Life", issued by Tamla with "Angie Girl" as its B-side, was later included as the title track on Wonder's For Once in My Life album.

Wonder's version of the track is often singled out by bassists as the greatest example of James Jamerson's playing style, with no two bars of music played alike during the whole song; a completely improvisational line that is both melodic and complementary to Wonder's vocal. Background vocals are by The Originals (Freddie Gorman, Walter Gaines, Hank Dixon, C.P. Spencer) and The Andantes (Jackie Hicks, Marlene Barrow, Louvain Demps), and instrumentation by The Funk Brothers.

Personnel
 Stevie Wonder – vocals, harmonica
 James Jamerson – bass 
 Uriel Jones – drums
 Earl Van Dyke - piano
 Background vocals are by Originals (Freddie Gorman, Walter Gaines, Hank Dixon, C.P. Spencer) and The Andantes (Jackie Hicks, Marlene Barrow, Louvain Demps)
 Additional instrumentation by The Funk Brothers

Charts

Weekly charts

Year-end charts

Certifications

Later recordings
 Jackie Wilson recorded a modified ballad version, more uptempo than Tony Bennett, but downbeat compared to Stevie Wonder. It lost in a cover record war, Wilson reaching number 70 in late 1968, Wonder peaking at number 2 in Billboards Hot 100.
 In 1969, Dorothy Squires recorded the song, arranged and conducted by Nicky Welsh on the President label, and had a chart hit in the UK reaching the No. 24 spot in an 11-week stay.
On June 17, 2012 The Voice Australia finalist Darren Percival performed a cover of the song reaching number 6 on the iTunes download list.

See also
List of Cash Box Top 100 number-one singles of 1968

References

External links
 

1965 songs
1967 singles
1968 singles
Songs written by Ron Miller (songwriter)
Jackie Wilson songs
Stevie Wonder songs
Glen Campbell songs
Dorothy Squires songs
Grammy Award for Best Pop Collaboration with Vocals
Tamla Records singles
President Records singles
Grammy Award for Best Instrumental Arrangement Accompanying Vocalist(s)
Cashbox number-one singles